A Loud Bash of Teenage Feelings is the second studio album by the American punk rock band Beach Slang, released on September 23, 2016 on Polyvinyl and Big Scary Monsters.

Recorded and released in less than a year following the band's debut album, A Loud Bash of Teenage Feelings is the last studio album to feature both drummer JP Flexner, who left Beach Slang following its recording, and guitarist Ruben Gallego who departed shortly after its release.

Track listing

References

2016 albums
Beach Slang albums
Polyvinyl Record Co. albums
Big Scary Monsters Recording Company albums